Soobrazitelny (lit. "astute"; alternate spellings Soobrazitelnyy, and Soobrazitelnyi) can refer to a number of Russian and Soviet warships:

 , a Soviet Navy 
 , a Soviet Navy  renamed Varyag while under construction
 , a Soviet Navy 
 , a Russian Navy 

Russian Navy ship names
Soviet Navy ship names